Abdemon (gen.: Αὐδήμονος), was a king of Cyprus towards the end of the 5th century BC. He was of Phoenician origin and was born either in Tyre or Kition on Cyprus. Around 415 BC, Abdemon deposed the Phoenician ruler of Salamis on Cyprus. Evagoras, who allegedly came from a Greek dynasty (Teucrids), had to leave the city and went into exile in Soloi. However, Evagoras returned in 411 BC with his followers and was able to depose Abdemon. Some coins of Abdemon have been found.

Notes

References 
 Abdemon. In: Neuer Pauly (English: Brill's New Pauly), vol. 1, 1996, col. 11-12.

5th-century BC rulers
5th-century BC Phoenician people
Kings of Salamis, Cyprus
Phoenician kings